Wael Shawky is an Egyptian artist.

Based on extensive periods of research and enquiry, Wael Shawky’s work tackles notions of national, religious and artistic identity through film, performance and storytelling. Shawky frames contemporary culture through the lens of historical tradition and vice versa. Mixing truth and fiction, childlike wonder and spiritual doctrine, Shawky has staged epic recreations of the medieval clashes between Muslims and Christians in his trilogy of puppets and marionettes.

Shawky was born in Alexandria, Egypt in 1971 and spent his youth in Mecca, Saudia before returning to Egypt when he was 13. Shawky is one of the most celebrated artists from the Middle East who has gained international recognition for his works which trace the history of the Crusades through a Middle Eastern lens. He holds an MFA from the University of Pennsylvania, Philadelphia, USA, and a BFA from the Alexandria University, Egypt.

In 2017, Wael Shawky premiered his latest project 'Song of Roland: The Arabic Version' at the opening of Theater der Welt 2017 in Hamburg, German. The large musical and theatrical installation translates the epic French verse 'La Chanson de Roland' into classic Arabic and features performances by 25 fidjeri singers. Fidjeri is a type of music sung by pearl divers from the Persian Gulf states, as part of a tradition dating back more than 800 years.

In 2016, Shawky had solo shows at the Kunsthaus Bregenz, Austria, The Fondazione Merz and Castello di Rivoli, both in Turin, Italy. In 2014, Serpentine Galleries in London held a solo exhibition of his work. Shawky's works can be found in numerous public collections, most notably: the Museum of Modern Art (MoMA), in New York City, US, the National Gallery of Canada, in Ottawa, Canada, and the Tate Collection, in London, UK. He is represented by Lisson Gallery.

Shawky has won many awards and prizes for his work. He won the Ernst Schering Foundation Art Award in 2011  and was the recipient of the first Mario Merz Prize (2015) for his film trilogy, Al Araba Al Madfuna.

In 2015, Shawky had an exhibition entitled "Crusades and Other Stories" at the Mathaf: Arab Museum of Modern Art.

In his ambitious film trilogy, Cabaret Crusades, Wael takes as his subject the complex historical and sociopolitical narratives surrounding the Christian Holy Wars. The series began in 2010 and was finally completed in January 2015, when it premiered at MoMA P.S.1, New York. Cabaret Crusades consists of three films: The Horror Show File, The Path to Cairo, and The Secrets of Karbala, loosely inspired by Lebanese writer Amin Maalouf's The Crusades Through Arab Eyes. Shawky's films depict various historical accounts in an attempt to provide and illustrate an Arab perspective on the Crusades (from 1095 to 1204). All the characters in Shawky's three films are played by marionettes and feature classical Arabic. The second episode, The Path to Cairo, featured marionettes made of clay - a material believed to be what humans are made of according to the Qu'ran.

In 2011, Shawky presented his work at the 12th Istanbul Biennial. In 2013, he created a live performance piece for the Sharjah Biennial from his 'Dictums' series, where 30 workers (primarily of Pakistani descent) sing a song in qawwali, a form of Sufi devotional music with words borrowed from the curatorial statement of the Biennial. Shawky went on to receive the Sharjah Biennial prize for the work  In 2010, Shawky launched MASS Alexandria which is the first independent studio programme for young artists in Alexandria, Egypt.

In 2017, Shawky undertook a residency at Mathaf: Arab Museum of Modern Art, in partnership with the Fire Station, in Doha, Qatar, where he conducted research for his first feature-length film on the history of oil production in the Persian Gulf. Filming for the project began in 2018.

References 

Egyptian artists
1971 births
Living people